The United States Potash Railroad was a  narrow gauge railroad built in 1931 to carry potash from the mines to the mill at Loving, New Mexico where the Atchison, Topeka & Santa Fe Railroad had a spur that went out to the refinery to carry out the processed potash. The  railroad was located at Loving, New Mexico, just east of Carlsbad, New Mexico, USA, and Carlsbad Caverns National Park.

History
The railroad was originally built and operated with former Death Valley Railroad equipment, rails and employees. The two 2-8-0 Baldwin locomotives from the Death Valley Railroad, along with another engine of similar design coming from the Morenci & Southern Railroad, pulled the trains until about 1948 when they were replaced by specially-built diesel-electric locomotives from General Electric.

The railroad ceased operation in 1967 when U.S. Potash merged with Pacific Coast Borax Company to become the U.S. Borax & Chemical Corporation. Then they were bought out by Rio Tinto Minerals and moved their mining focus onto the borax at Boron.

Preservation
Whilst the three diesels were scrapped, the three steam engines that worked the line all survived. No. 1 is currently on display near Municipal Beach Park at Carlsbad, New Mexico, No. 2 is on display at the Borax Museum at Furnace Creek in Death Valley, as she was Death Valley Railroad's No. 2 and sports her former railroad's colors. No. 3 is on display at the RailGiants Train Museum at Fairplex, Pomona, California. Death Valley Railroad's No. 5, a Brill railcar was used to transport workmen from Loving to work at the mine and the mill and she is now preserved at the Laws Railroad Museum at Bishop. A few trucks from the old DVRR ore cars and caboose are now at the Laws Railroad Museum. Two tankcar bodies, also ex-Death Valley Railroad, are located near Carlsbad.

See also 
 Trona Railway: a potash railroad in California

References

http://ngdiscussion.net/phorum/read.php?1,71415,71472#msg-71472

Defunct New Mexico railroads
Eddy County, New Mexico
Mining railways in the United States
Mining in New Mexico
Narrow gauge railroads in New Mexico
3 ft gauge railways in the United States
Potash